Yumiko Ono (born 3 March 1954) is a Japanese former swimmer. She competed in the women's 4 × 100 metre freestyle relay at the 1968 Summer Olympics.

References

External links
 

1954 births
Living people
Japanese female freestyle swimmers
Olympic swimmers of Japan
Swimmers at the 1968 Summer Olympics
Sportspeople from Osaka Prefecture